Hussein Jwayed (born January 1, 1993, in Aleppo) is a Syrian footballer. He plays for Al-Ittihad in Syria.
he made his international debut with Syria in 2012, in Wes Asian cup.
he became the Captain of his team Al-Zawraa in 2017, after playing with them for 5 years since 2013.

Honours

Club
Al-Zawraa
 Iraqi Premier League: 2015–16, 2017–18
Iraq FA Cup: 2016–17, 2018–19
Iraqi Super Cup: 2017

References

External links
 

1993 births
Living people
Syrian footballers
Syria international footballers
Syrian expatriate footballers
Expatriate footballers in Iraq
Syrian expatriate sportspeople in Iraq
Association football midfielders
Sportspeople from Aleppo
2019 AFC Asian Cup players
Syrian Premier League players
21st-century Syrian people